Santos FC is a football club based in Santos, that competes in the Campeonato Paulista, São Paulo's state league, and the Campeonato Brasileiro Série A or Brasileirão, Brazil's national league. The club was founded in 1912 by the initiative of three sports enthusiasts from Santos by the names of Raimundo Marques, Mário Ferraz de Campos, and Argemiro de Souza Júnior, and played its first friendly match on 23 June 1914. Initially Santos played against other local clubs in the city and state championships, but in 1959 the club became one of the founding members of the Taça Brasil, Brazil's first truly national league. As of 2010, Santos is one of only five clubs never to have been relegated from the top level of Brazilian football, the others being São Paulo, Flamengo, Internacional and Cruzeiro.

The first full-time manager for Santos was Urbano Caldeira. He originally came from São Paulo to work as a clerk for the club but soon became a player/manager who spent his spare time planting trees and gardens for Santos. The most successful Santos FC manager in terms of trophies won is Lula, who won five Brasileirão titles, eight Campeonato Paulista trophies, four Rio-São Paulo tournaments, two Intercontinental Cups and two Copa Libertadores trophies, the most prestigious laurel in South America, in his 12-year reign as manager. Under Lula's management, Santos became the first club in Brazil and the world to win the continental treble consisting of the Paulista, Taça Brasil, and the Copa Libertadores. That same year, it also became the first football club ever to win four out of four competitions in a single year, thus completing the quadruple, comprising the aforementioned treble and the Intercontinental Cup.

As of 2011 the manager is Muricy Ramalho, becoming the second manager, after Lula, to win the Copa Libertadores and the continental double by winning the 2011 Campeonato Paulista and the 2011 Copa Libertadores.

List of managers
During the first 46 years of Santos's existence, from 1912 to 1958, Brazil did not have a national football league. Santos competed almost solely in the championship of the city of Santos.

In 1959, the Taça Brasil, Brazil's first national football league, was formed, with Santos among the founder members. The club continue to participate in the Paulista championship which continued alongside the Brasileirão. Clubs qualified to the Taça Brasil based on their placings in the regional championships until 1967, when it became open to all teams through the Robertão.

References

External links
 List of Santos' Managers

Santos FC